is a music museum in the Otaru Orgel-do II building in Otaru, Japan. It includes various examples of music boxes as well as CDs that have music box-esque versions of various songs. Chris Bamforth of The Japan Times wrote that it had an "absolutely phenomenal" variety of music.

The main building of the museum was constructed in 1902. The antique music boxes are in Hall 2.

There are about 25,000 music boxes in the collection.

See also 
 List of music museums

References

External links
 Musicbox Museum Otaru
 Musicbox Museum Otaru 

Museums in Hokkaido
Buildings and structures in Otaru
Music box museums